The 1983 Lisbon Open – Singles was an event of the 1983 Lisbon Open men's tennis tournament held in Lisbon, Portugal from 4 April until 10 April 1983. The draw comprised 32 players and eight players were seeded. Second-seeded Mats Wilander won the singles title, defeating third-seeded Yannick Noah in the final, 2–6, 7–6, 6–4.

Seeds

  José Higueras (semifinals)
  Mats Wilander (champion)
  Yannick Noah (final)
  Andrés Gómez (second round)
  Jimmy Arias (second round)
  Balázs Taróczy (first round)
  Manuel Orantes (first round)
  Henrik Sundström (second round)

Draws

Key
Q - Qualifier

Finals

Section 1

Section 2

References

External links
 1983 Lisbon Open draw

Lisbon Open
Lisbon Open
Lisbon